Sing: Chapter 1 is the seventh studio album from country music singer Wynonna Judd, released on February 3, 2009. It is her seventh solo studio album and the follow-up to her 2003 album What the World Needs Now Is Love and her holiday-themed 2006 release A Classic Christmas. This release celebrates Wynonna's 25th Anniversary in the music business.

Album information
Wynonna teamed up with Brent Maher and Don Potter - the duo behind the many releases that Wynonna had as one half of the mother-daughter duo The Judds with mom Naomi Judd.

The album, contains 11 cover songs which Wynonna states "are a real cross-section of all the different genres I grew up with.  It’s all me, its all part of the tapestry of who I am.  This record is musical ADD. It's that simple. Every genre is represented on this record, and by God, it works. It's all the different chapters of my life," she said. "These are part of the backdrop of everyday life in the Judd family. It's snapshots ... of joy, pain, sorrow, life, death, divorce, kids, the whole enchilada."

The 12th song on the album is the title track and is the sole original song on the album, and was written by Rodney Crowell. The record label, Curb, commissioned dance remixes of the track by Almighty, Pete Hammond, Digital Dog and Jody den Broeder. The tracks are available together on a CD called 'Wynonna - Sing Remixes' and were also released to DJs as CD promos. The Maxi-Single is available for digital download at iTunes.

Sing has been in production for over a year and a half. It includes Wynonna's first studio recording of Burt Bacharach's "Anyone Who Had A Heart."  Wynonna previously recorded this song live for Bacharach's 1999 concert release One Amazing Night as well as in duet with Dionne Warwick for Warwick's 2006 album My Friends & Me.

Commercial performance
In the United States, the album debuted at  No. 37 on the Billboard 200 albums chart on its first week of release, with around 13,000 copies sold. It also debuted at No. 5 on the Billboard's Top Country Albums chart, and No. 18 on the Internet Albums chart. As of January 2016, the album has sold 60,000 copies in the US.

Track listing
"That's How Rhythm Was Born" (George Whiting, J. C. Johnson, Nat Burton) - 3:05
"I'm So Lonesome I Could Cry" (Hank Williams) - 4:05
"Woman Be Wise" (Sippy Wallace) - 4:39
"I Hear You Knocking" (Dave Bartholomew, Pearl King) - 2:55
"Till I Get It Right" (Larry Henley, Red Lane) - 3:23
"Are the Good Times Really Over" (Merle Haggard) - 4:49
"The House Is Rockin'" (Doyle Bramhall, Stevie Ray Vaughan) - 2:33
"Ain't No Sunshine" (Bill Withers) - 3:19
"I'm a Woman" (Jerry Leiber, Mike Stoller) - 4:04
"Anyone Who Had a Heart" (Burt Bacharach, Hal David) - 4:01
"When I Fall In Love" (Victor Young, Edward Heyman) - 4:17
"Sing" (Rodney Crowell) - 4:59

Personnel

 Roy Agee – trombone
 Eddie Bayers – drums
 Brian Beatty – background vocals
 Kerry Beatty – background vocals
 Bekka Bramlett – background vocals
 Bob Britt – electric guitar
 Elicia Brown – background vocals
 Jeremy Calloway – background vocals
 Spencer Campbell – bass guitar
 Maurice Carter – background vocals
 Bruce Dailey – piano
 Mark Douthit – tenor saxophone
 Carl Gorodetzky – string contractor
 Vicki Hampton – background vocals
 Mike Haynes – trumpet
 Prentiss Hobbs – trombone, bass trombone
 Wynonna Judd – lead vocals, background vocals
 Fats Kaplin – accordion, fiddle
 Sam Levine – clarinet, baritone saxophone
 Charlie McCoy – harmonica
 Brent Maher – African drum, percussion
 Mike Maple – drums
 Keb' Mo' – slide guitar
 Gordon Mote – organ, piano, Wurlitzer
 The Nashville String Machine – strings
 Don Potter – Archguitar, dobro, acoustic guitar, electric guitar, gut string guitar, soloist, synthesizer
 Mike Rojas – organ, piano
 Mark Selby – harmonica
 Jaimee Paul Shires – background vocals
 Larry Strickland – background vocals
 Ilya Toshinsky – banjo
 Bergen White – string arrangements
 Glenn Worf – bass guitar
 Nir Z. – congas, drums

Charts

Album

Singles

Release history

References

External links
 

Wynonna Judd albums
2009 albums
Covers albums
Asylum-Curb Records albums
Albums produced by Brent Maher